Yuki Bhambri and Divij Sharan were the defending champions.
Bhambri decided not to participate whereas Sharan competed with Purav Raja, but they lost to Alex Bogomolov Jr. and Dudi Sela in the first round.
Peng Hsien-yin and Yang Tsung-hua defeated Jeong Suk-young and Lim Yong-kyu 6–4, 6–3 in the final to win the title.

Seeds

Draw

Draw

References
 Main Draw

Busan Open Challenger Tennisandnbsp;- Doubles
2013 Doubles